Kathryn Stockett is an American novelist. She is known for her 2009 debut novel, The Help, which is about African-American maids working in white households in Jackson, Mississippi, during the 1960s.

Career
Stockett worked in magazine publishing while living in New York City before publishing her first novel, which she began writing after the September 11th attacks. The Help took her five years to complete, and the book was rejected by 60 literary agents before agent Susan Ramer agreed to represent Stockett. The Help has since been published in 42 languages. As of August 2012, it has sold ten million copies and spent more than 100 weeks on The New York Times Best Seller list. 
The Help climbed best seller charts a few months after it was released.

Personal life
Stockett grew up in Jackson, Mississippi. After graduating from the University of Alabama with a degree in English and Creative Writing, she moved to New York City. She lived there for 16 years and worked in magazine publishing and marketing. She is divorced and has a daughter.

Reflective of her first novel, Stockett was very close to an African American domestic worker.

A lawsuit was filed in a Mississippi court by Ablene Cooper, a housekeeper who used to work for Stockett's brother. It claimed that Stockett used her likeness in the book. A Hinds County, Mississippi judge threw the case out of court, citing the statute of limitations. Stockett denies her claim of stealing her likeness and says she only met her briefly.

References 

1969 births
Living people
The Help
Writers from Jackson, Mississippi
Writers from Atlanta
University of Alabama alumni
American women novelists
21st-century American novelists
21st-century American women writers
Novelists from Mississippi
Novelists from Georgia (U.S. state)